Susan Orlean (born October 31, 1955) is a journalist, television writer, and bestselling author of The Orchid Thief and The Library Book. She has been a staff writer for The New Yorker since 1992, and has contributed articles to many magazines including Vogue, Rolling Stone, Esquire, and Outside. In 2021, Orlean joined the writing team of HBO comedy series How To with John Wilson.

Orlean authored the 1998 non-fiction book The Orchid Thief, which was adapted into the film Adaptation (2002). Meryl Streep received an Academy Award nomination for her performance as Orlean.

Early life
Orlean was raised in Shaker Heights, Ohio, the daughter of Edith (née Gross 1923–2016) and Arthur Orlean (1915–2007). She has a sister and a brother. Her family is Jewish. Her mother's family is from Hungary and her father's family from Poland. Her father was an attorney and businessman.

Orlean graduated from the University of Michigan with honors in 1976, studying literature and history. After college she moved to Portland, Oregon, and was planning on going to law school, when she began writing for the Willamette Week.

Career
Orlean has published stories in Rolling Stone, Esquire, Vogue, Outside and Spy. In 1982, she became a staff writer for the Boston Phoenix and later a regular contributor to the Boston Globe Sunday Magazine. Her first book, Saturday Night, was published in 1990, shortly after she moved to New York City from Boston and began writing for The New Yorker magazine. She started contributing to The New Yorker in 1987 and became a staff writer in 1992.

Orlean authored the book The Orchid Thief, a profile of Florida orchid grower, breeder and collector John Laroche. The book formed the basis of Charlie Kaufman's script for the Spike Jonze film Adaptation. Orlean (portrayed by Meryl Streep, who won a Golden Globe for the performance) was, in effect, made into a fictional character. The movie portrayed her becoming Laroche's lover and partner in a drug production operation, in which orchids were processed into a psychoactive substance.

She also wrote the Women's Outside article "Life's Swell", published in 1998. That article, a feature on a group of young surfer girls in Maui, was the basis of the film Blue Crush.

In 1999, she co-wrote The Skinny: What Every Skinny Woman Knows About Dieting (And Won't Tell You!) under her married name, Susan Sistrom. Her previously published magazine stories have been compiled in two collections, The Bullfighter Checks Her Makeup: My Encounters with Extraordinary People and My Kind of Place: Travel Stories from a Woman Who's Been Everywhere. She also served as editor for Best American Essays 2005 and Best American Travel Writing 2007. She contributed the Ohio chapter in State By State (2008), and in 2011 she published a biographical history of the dog actor Rin Tin Tin titled Rin Tin Tin: The Life and the Legend.

When Orlean's son had a school assignment to interview a city employee, he chose a librarian and together they visited the Studio City branch of the Los Angeles Public Library system which reignited her own childhood passion for libraries. After an immersive project involving three years of research and two years of writing on the 1986 fire at the Los Angeles Central Library, The Library Book was released in October 2018. The book uses the context of the April 1986 fire to explore the role of the public library, who uses them, and the void created if they are lost. Orlean hired a fact-checker to ensure the book was accurate, explaining "I don't want a substantial error that changes the meaning of my book, but I also don't want silly errors". She collaborated on the adaption for television.

In 2021, Orlean joined the writing staff of television series How To with John Wilson for the show's second season on HBO.

Personal life
Orlean married lawyer Peter Sistrom (1955–2021) in 1983, and they divorced after 16 years of marriage. She was introduced by a friend to author and businessman John Gillespie, whom she married in 2001, and she gave birth to their son in 2004.

She is also step-mother to John's son from his previous marriage.

Awards and honors
Orlean was a Nieman Fellow at Harvard University in 2004. She received an honorary Doctor of Human Letters degree from the University of Michigan at the spring commencement ceremony in 2012. She was awarded a Guggenheim Fellowship in 2014 in the "General Nonfiction" field of study. Orlean was the winner of the 7th Annual Shorty Awards in the Author category, which honors the best social and digital media.

Bibliography

Books 
 
 The Orchid Thief (1998) 
 The Bullfighter Checks Her Makeup: My Encounters with Extraordinary People (2001) 
 My Kind of Place: Travel Stories from a Woman Who's Been Everywhere, (2004) (Random House Trade Paperbacks). 
 Animalish (Kindle Single) (2011)
 Rin Tin Tin: The Life and the Legend (2011) 
 The Floral Ghost (2016) 
 The Library Book (2018) (Simon and Schuster).

Essays and reporting
 
 
 
 
 
 
 
 
 

Notes

References

External links

Susan Orlean Official Website
IdentityTheory.com interview
New Yorker contributor page for Susan Orlean
Finding aid to Susan Orlean papers at Columbia University. Rare Book & Manuscript Library.
Susan Orlean articles at Byliner
Susan Orlean discusses Rin Tin Tin on The Lit Show
Radio Interview with Susan Orlean on Read First, Ask Later (Ep. 20)
Orlean interviewed on Creative Nonfiction Podcast  discussing the entrepreneurial nature of a writing career

1955 births
Living people
21st-century American Jews
21st-century American women
American people of Hungarian-Jewish descent
American people of Polish-Jewish descent
American women journalists
American women writers
Jewish American writers
Journalists from Ohio
Nieman Fellows
Shorty Award winners
The New Yorker people
The New Yorker staff writers
University of Michigan College of Literature, Science, and the Arts alumni
Writers from Cleveland
Writers from Shaker Heights, Ohio